The arrondissement of Bonneville is an arrondissement of France in the Haute-Savoie department in the Auvergne-Rhône-Alpes region. It has 60 communes.

Composition

The communes of the arrondissement of Bonneville, and their INSEE codes, are:

 Amancy (74007)
 Arâches-la-Frasse (74014)
 Arenthon (74018)
 Ayse (74024)
 Bonneville (74042)
 Brizon (74049)
 Chamonix-Mont-Blanc (74056)
 La Chapelle-Rambaud (74059)
 Châtillon-sur-Cluses (74064)
 Cluses (74081)
 Combloux (74083)
 Les Contamines-Montjoie (74085)
 Contamine-sur-Arve (74087)
 Cordon (74089)
 Cornier (74090)
 La Côte-d'Arbroz (74091)
 Demi-Quartier (74099)
 Domancy (74103)
 Etaux (74116)
 Faucigny (74122)
 Les Gets (74134)
 Glières-Val-de-Borne (74212)
 Les Houches (74143)
 Magland (74159)
 Marcellaz (74162)
 Marignier (74164)
 Marnaz (74169)
 Megève (74173)
 Mégevette (74174)
 Mieussy (74183)
 Mont-Saxonnex (74189)
 Morillon (74190)
 Nancy-sur-Cluses (74196)
 Onnion (74205)
 Passy (74208)
 Peillonnex (74209)
 Praz-sur-Arly (74215)
 Le Reposoir (74221)
 La Rivière-Enverse (74223)
 La Roche-sur-Foron (74224)
 Saint-Gervais-les-Bains (74236)
 Saint-Jean-de-Tholome (74240)
 Saint-Jeoire (74241)
 Saint-Laurent (74244)
 Saint-Pierre-en-Faucigny (74250)
 Saint-Sigismond (74252)
 Saint-Sixt (74253)
 Sallanches (74256)
 Samoëns (74258)
 Scionzier (74264)
 Servoz (74266)
 Sixt-Fer-à-Cheval (74273)
 Taninges (74276)
 Thyez (74278)
 La Tour (74284)
 Vallorcine (74290)
 Verchaix (74294)
 Ville-en-Sallaz (74304)
 Viuz-en-Sallaz (74311)
 Vougy (74312)

History

The arrondissement of Bonneville was created in 1860.

As a result of the reorganisation of the cantons of France which came into effect in 2015, the borders of the cantons are no longer related to the borders of the arrondissements. The cantons of the arrondissement of Bonneville were, as of January 2015:

 Bonneville
 Chamonix-Mont-Blanc
 Cluses
 La Roche-sur-Foron
 Saint-Gervais-les-Bains
 Saint-Jeoire
 Sallanches
 Samoëns
 Scionzier
 Taninges

References

Bonneville